Aliansce Sonae is the second largest shopping mall owner, developer, and manager in Brazil. It was founded in 2004 through a joint venture between the Brazilian company Nacional Iguatemi and GGP. GGP sold its interests in 2016. The company has 40 shopping malls and approximately 1.4 million meters of gross leasable area (GLA).

Aliansce Sonae is one of the industry's leading shopping malls company in Brazil and is one of the five Shopping malls company listed on B3.

The main activities of the company are the shares in shopping malls and services segment of shopping centers, which involves: the administration of shopping centers;  the sale of shopping mall space; and planning and development of shopping centers. The company is a full service company with operations in all phases of implementation of shopping centers, from planning, development, and launch to the management structure and financial, commercial, legal and operational of Malls.

Portfolio 

Aliansce's portfolio includes shopping centers located in all five Brazilian regions and targeting all incomes groups. The company manages 26 shopping malls and is a stakeholder in 18 of them, totaling more than 590 thousand square meters of GLA. The portfolio also includes participation in two shopping malls that are still under development and should open between in 2010 and 2012. In addition to the 18 malls where the company holds an equity interest, except supershopping and the Osasco Shopping Santa Ursula, Aliansce runs seven shopping malls throughout the country and is responsible for planning the Boulevard Shopping Campos.

References 

Brazilian companies established in 2004
Companies based in Rio de Janeiro (city)
Real estate companies of Brazil
Shopping center management firms
Companies listed on B3 (stock exchange)
Real estate companies established in 2004